AstraQom International is a multi-national holding company that serves the telecommunications sector. The company is a provider of VoIP services and integrated communication solutions.

AstraQom currently provides VoIP services in more than 100 countries, covering 4 major regions: the Americas, Asia-Pacific, and the Europe, Middle East and Africa Region.

Background 
AstraQom was founded in 2008 as AstraQom Corporation. In 2009, AstraQom Corp amalgamated with Aon Communications (Canada) Inc., a network development provider based in Ottawa.

In August 2011, the company moved its headquarters to Ottawa, Ontario to consolidate its Canadian offices and establish a headquarters. 
In early 2012, the first subsidiary was created as a Canadian VoIP business provider – AstraQom Canada Corporation – a Federal Canadian corporation with main offices in Ottawa, Ontario. That same year, AstraQom's Immersion in Promoting Industry Peers won the 2011 Kamailio (OpenSER) Award.

In April 2012, AstraQom expanded their Hosted PBX client services with the addition of a Virtual Receptionist service. A virtual receptionist service provides a live answering option to small businesses that cannot afford, or do not need, a full-time receptionist. The service uses a toll-free number that is answered by agents who act as receptionists for various companies.

AstraQom Canada, AstraQom International's subsidiary, expanded in December 2013 by acquiring Shi Lian Telecom, a business telephone service provider targeting Chinese-owned businesses in Canada and the United States.

In May 2014, AstraQom moved its global headquarters to Silicon Valley and opened an office in San Jose, California.

Early in 2015, AstraQom Canada moved its headquarters to the Greater Toronto Area (GTA), opening its second Canadian office and 6th international office. The company's Ottawa office now serves as its main network hub. It also started supporting immigrant entrepreneurs, small businesses and diversity initiatives.

Global expansion of AstraQom has included the opening of offices in the United States, the United Kingdom, Australia and New Zealand in 2015, followed by the Philippines and Brazil, in 2016, followed by a move of the company's headquarters to Campbell California.

Services 
AstraQom provides a variety of telecom-related services including: Hosted PBX, E-Fax (incoming faxes at no charge), Virtual telephone numbers (over 100 countries covered), Virtual office, A-Z Termination, Vanity Numbers, SIP Trunking.

Its Computer telephony integrations solutions include CRM, Hotel and Call Center software integrated with AstraQom's Hosted PBX.

Coverage 
AstraQom offers Voice over IP and a range of integrated solutions to the following regions and countries:

Projects and partnerships 
In June 2012, AstraQom partnered with Bios Technologies, a provider of computer and network hardware and services serving the West Quebec and Ottawa areas. Bios became the provider of IP communications solutions to federal and provincial public functions, hospitals and businesses, as a re-seller for AstraQom products and services. Following this, AstraQom expanded its Channel Partner program and currently has hundreds of carefully selected resellers around the world.

See also 
 List of VOIP companies

References

Telecommunications companies of Canada
Information technology companies of Canada
VoIP companies of the United Kingdom
VoIP companies of Australia
VoIP companies of Canada